Angel Colón-Pérez (born 1977 in Aibonito, Puerto Rico) is an Associate Justice of the Supreme Court of Puerto Rico whose nomination was announced by Governor Alejandro García Padilla on April 8, 2016.  At the time of his nomination, it had pending confirmation by the Senate of Puerto Rico for over two months, a significantly longer period of time than all Supreme Court nominations made during the past decade.

Born in Aibonito, he studied at the José Gándara High School in his hometown.  He has a BBA from the University of Puerto Rico, Río Piedras Campus and is a graduate of the  Interamerican University of Puerto Rico School of Law, where he was an editor of its law review.  He subsequently served as a law clerk to Associate Justice Miriam Naveira, who subsequently became the court's first female Chief Justice. Afterwards, he worked for Chief Justice Federico Hernández Denton, who upon Colón-Pérez' appointment as a Superior Court judge, never assigned him a courtroom in order to keep him as his Chief of Staff in the Supreme Court. He also served as Executive Director of the Bar Exam Committee. For several years he was an adjunct professor at Interamerican Law School.  In 2013, Governor García Padilla appointed him as his chief legal and legislative counsel until his nomination to the High Court.

His nomination was praised by Associate Justice Luis Estrella Martínez, who, with Colón-Pérez' accession to the court, would be the most senior of the three members of the court's youngest generation, along with 46-year-old Chief Justice Maite Oronoz Rodríguez.

At his confirmation hearing on June 22, 2016 at the Senate of Puerto Rico he was praised by the Judiciary Committee Chairman, Senator Miguel Pereira Castillo, Senate President Eduardo Bhatia and Minority Leader Larry Seilhamer. He was confirmed by the Senate on June 28, 2016.

References

1977 births
Interamerican University of Puerto Rico alumni
Living people
Associate Justices of the Supreme Court of Puerto Rico
People from Aibonito, Puerto Rico
Puerto Rican judges
University of Puerto Rico alumni